is a train station in Kita-ku, Nagoya, Aichi Prefecture, Japan, operated by Meitetsu.

Lines

Station layout
The station has two opposed side platforms with an elevated station building. The station has automated ticket machines, Manaca automated turnstiles and is unattended..

Platforms

Adjacent stations

|-
!colspan=5|Nagoya Railroad

Station history
Ajima Station was opened on February 11, 1931.

Passenger statistics
In fiscal 2017, the station was used by an average of 4417 passengers daily.

Surrounding area
Futagoyama kofun

See also
 List of Railway Stations in Japan

References

External links

 Official web page 

Railway stations in Japan opened in 1931
Railway stations in Aichi Prefecture
Stations of Nagoya Railroad
Railway stations in Nagoya